Charley Weaver's Hobby Lobby was a half-hour television interview show produced by Allan Sherman and the American Broadcasting Company (ABC), and broadcast weekly in
the United States by the ABC network 8–8:30 pm (Eastern Standard Time) on Wednesdays in the 1959–60 television season.

History
The show premiered on
September 30, 1959.  Cliff Arquette, in his Charley Weaver persona, hosted the show
throughout the run of the series.  For the first two months, the show was called Charley Weaver's Hobby Lobby, but on November 25, 1959, the name of the show was changed to The Charley Weaver Show.

The first episodes essentially followed the same format as the Hobby Lobby radio interview show hosted by Dave Elman and broadcast from 1937 to 1949: people, both celebrities and not, were interviewed about their hobbies, both unusual and not.  However, at the end of November (and perhaps earlier),
"variety and comedy sketches" had been added, and hobby discussions were dropped.  Charley Weaver's "Letters from Mama" monologues concerning daily life in the fictional town of Mount Idy were always part of the show, with the other members of the cast playing characters referred to in the letters.

Cast
 Cliff Arquette (Host) as Charley Weaver and as Charley's mother, "Mama Weaver"
 Pat Carroll
 Chuck McCann as Wallis Swine
 Charles R. Althoff as Grandpa Snyder
 Nancy Kovack (credited as Nancy Kovac) as "witch of the year"
 Irene Ryan as beauty pageant winner Miss Mount Idy

Guests
Guests on the show included:
 Gloria DeHaven (September 30, 1959) Hobby discussed:  Antique Music Boxes 
 Gypsy Rose Lee (October 7, 1959).  Hobby discussed: Sport Fishing.
 Zsa Zsa Gabor (October 14, 1959). Hobby discussed: Fencing.
 Guy Madison (November 4, 1959). Hobby discussed: Archery
 Eddie Bracken (November 18, 1959).
 Edie Adams (November 25, 1959).
 Abigail Van Buren (November 25, 1959)
 Faye Emerson (December 2, 1959).
 Harold Rome (December 2, 1959).
 Audrey Meadows (December 9, 1959).
 Cedric Hardwicke (December 16, 1959).
 Barbara Nichols (December 23, 1959).
 Arthur Treacher (December 30, 1959).
 Maureen O'Hara (1960?)

Final show
The last show was broadcast March 23, 1960.

References

External links
 

1959 American television series debuts
1960 American television series endings
American Broadcasting Company original programming
Black-and-white American television shows